One, Two... Five is the fifth studio album by the Serbian Irish folk/Celtic rock band Orthodox Celts released in 2007.

Unlike the band's previous releases, for which most of the band's songs were composed by violinist Ana Đokić, songs on One, Two... Five were composed mostly by Dejan Lalić. One, Two... Five was the band's last album to feature Ana Đokić. Like the band's previous album, A Moment Like the Longest Day, One, Two... Five was produced by Block Out leader Nikola Vranjković.

One, Two... Five is Orthodox Celts' only studio album to feature a cover which is not a cover of Irish folk song. It is a cover of the Thin Lizzy song "Sarah".

Track list

Personnel
Aleksandar Petrović – vocals, spoons
Ana Đokić-Brusić – violin
Dušan Živanović – drums
Dejan Lalić – mandola, mandolin, backing vocals, engineer
Vladan Jovković – acoustic guitar, backing vocals
Dejan Grujić – guitar, bass guitar, keyboards
Dejan Popin – whistles

Additional personnel
Nikola Vranjković – slide guitar (on track 10), producer, arranged by
Saša Ranđelović – slide guitar (on track 10)
Aleksandar "Era" Eraković – backing vocals
Jelena Popin-Stanošević – backing vocals
Zoran Antonijević – backing vocals (on track 10)
Marko Jovanović – engineer
Marko Nježić – engineer

References

One, Two... Five at Discogs

External links
One, Two... Five at Discogs

Orthodox Celts albums
2007 albums